Falmouth is an unincorporated community and census-designated place (CDP) in Missaukee County in the U.S. state of Michigan. The community is located within Clam Union Township. Its population was 183 at the 2020 census.

History 
It began as a lumbering settlement and was first known as Pinhook. A post office named Falmouth was established on December 18, 1871, with Eugene W. Watson as the first postmaster. In 1873, Falmouth nearly became the county seat, losing to Reeder (now Lake City) by one vote. John Koopman built a store in 1879, and in 1881 bought the village plat, along with its saw, shingle and grist mill.

Geography 
The Falmouth post office, with ZIP code 49632, also serves portions of northern and eastern Clam Union Township, as well as all of Holland Township to the east, and portions of Butterfield Township to the northeast, Aetna Township to the north, and smaller areas in Reeder Township to the northwest and Riverside Township to the west.

Demographics

Transportation 
The main roads that provide access to Falmouth are Prosper Road (to the east), 7 Mile Road (to the northeast), Forward Road (to the north and south), and Falmouth Road (to the west.

References 

Unincorporated communities in Missaukee County, Michigan
Unincorporated communities in Michigan
Census-designated places in Michigan
Census-designated places in Missaukee County, Michigan
1871 establishments in Michigan
Populated places established in 1871